Tonna luteostoma is a species of large sea snail, a marine gastropod mollusc in the family Tonnidae, the tun snails or tun shells.

References

 Powell A. W. B., William Collins Publishers Ltd, Auckland 1979 

Tonnidae
Gastropods described in 1857